Nasr (meaning "Victory") or Al-Nasr or variant Al Nasr or An-Nasr or An Nasr with the definite article Al- and An- (in Arabic) meaning "The Victory"

Nasr and its variants may refer to:

Places
 Al Nasr, Dubai, a community in Dubai, United Arab Emirates
 Al Nasr Wal Salam, also known as Al-Hasuah, city in the Abu Ghraib district of Baghdad Governorate, Iraq
 Nasr City, a suburb of Cairo, Egypt
 Nasar, Iran, also known as Nasr, a village in Razavi Khorasan Province, Iran
 Nasr, Ilam, a village in Ilam Province, Iran
 Jemdet Nasr, a tell or settlement mound in Babil Governorate, Iraq
 Teniet En-Nasr, town and commune in Bordj Bou Arréridj Province, Algeria

People
 Nasr (name): list of people with the name or surname Nasr
 Nasr I, Samanid amir ruled 864–892
 Nasr II, Samanid amir, ruled 914–943
 Nasr, Sultan of Granada (1287–1322), in the Nasrid dynasty

Politics
 Al-Nasr (Afghanistan), a Hazara militant group
 El Nasr Party, or in English The Victory Party, Sufi political party in Egypt

Religion
 An-Nasr, or Sūrat al-Naṣr, the 110th sura of the Qur'an
 An-Nasr Mosque, mosque located in the Palestinian city of Nablus
 Umm al-Naser Mosque, mosque in Palestinian city of Beit Hanoun

Sports 
Al-Nasr SC (Bahrain), Bahraini sports club
Al Nasr FC (Cairo), Egyptian football club based in Cairo
Al-Nasr SC (Dubai), Emirati sports club
Al-Nasr SC (Benghazi), Libyan sports club
Al-Nasr SC (Iraq), Iraqi sports club in Dhi Qar
Al-Nasr SC (Kuwait), Kuwaiti sports club based in Ardiyah, Al Farwaniyah, Kuwait
Al-Nasr SC (Salalah), Omani sports club in Salalah
Al-Nassr FC, Saudi football club
Al-Nasr wal-Salam SC, Iraqi sports club in Baghdad
Nasr Athlétique de Hussein Dey, Algerian sports club based in Hussein Dey
ASC Nasr de Sebkha, Mauritanian football club based in Sebkha
Al Nasr (horse), a French-trained thoroughbred racehorse

Other
 Nasr (idol), an idol mentioned in the Qur'an
 Nasr (car company), the state-owned Egyptian car manufacturer
 Nasr-1, an Iran-made cruise missile
 Nasr (missile), a Pakistan-made battlefield range ballistic missile (BRBM)
 El Nasr Boys' School, school in El Shatby, Alexandria, Egypt
 El Nasr Girls' College, school in El Shatby, Alexandria, Egypt

Acronym
 National Airspace System Resources, an aeronautical database maintained by the National Flight Data Center (NFDC), a department of the U.S. Federal Aviation Administration (FAA)

See also 
 Naser (disambiguation)
 Nassar
 Nasser (disambiguation)